Connewarre, is a locality in Victoria, Australia, is located in the City of Greater Geelong and Surf Coast Shire, and is named after Lake Connewarre which is situated immediately to its north-east. Connewarre is a version of "kunuwarra", the name of the black swan in the Wathawurrung language.

Part of the Eastern Precinct of the large Armstrong Creek Growth Area was within Connewarre when urban development began in 2010, but in 2012, when the new suburb Armstrong Creek was gazetted, Connewarre's boundary was adjusted to exclude the area north of Lower Duneed Road and the west of Baenschs Lane, meaning that all of the Growth Area then lay outside Connewarre.

Settlements near Connewarre include Breamlea to the south, Torquay to the west and Barwon Heads to the east.

History
The Post Office opened on 9 September 1860 and closed in 1967. An earlier Connewarre office was renamed Mount Duneed.

The former Connewarre Primary School has been closed and merged with Mount Duneed Primary School.

Governance

The Connewarre road district was proclaimed in 1856, and extended in 1859 to include the Mount Duneed, Torquay & Breamlea districts. In 1874	it was amalgamated with South Barwon Borough to create South Barwon Shire. South Barwon Shire was proclaimed a City in 1974.

In May 1993 South Barwon City was amalgamated with part of Bannockburn Shire, part of Barrabool Shire, Bellarine Rural City, Corio Shire, Geelong City, Geelong West City & Newtown City to form Greater Geelong City. The part that became part of Greater Geelong City then became part of Surf Coast Shire on its creation in March 1994.

References

Towns in Victoria (Australia)
Coastal towns in Victoria (Australia)
Suburbs of Geelong